Kusum Nair (1919–1993) was an Indian journalist, and writer on agricultural policy from the cultural side. Her work challenged "agricultural fundamentalism". Blossoms in the Dust, a title taken from a 1941 film, was based on a journal from 1958, when she spent a year in Indian villages.

Life

She was born Kusum Prasad in Etah. Her early work dealt with Indian politics, and the Bombay Naval Mutiny of 1946. A Congress Socialist Party member, she was involved in the mutiny's planning.

Works
The Army of Occupation (1946)
Japan's Soviet Held Prisoners (1951)
Blossoms in the Dust: The Human Factor in Indian Development (1961)
The Lonely Furrow: Farming in the United States, Japan and India (1969)
Three Bowls of Rice; India and Japan: Century of Effort (1973)
In Defense of the Irrational Peasant: Indian Agriculture After the Green Revolution (1979)
Transforming Traditionally: Land and Labour Use in Asia and Africa (1983)

References
John Adams, Obituary: Kusum Nair (1919-1993), The Journal of Asian Studies, Vol. 53, No. 3 (Aug., 1994), pp. 1046–1048

Notes

External links
As Britannica contributor
Biblio.com

1919 births
1993 deaths
Agricultural writers
Indian political journalists
Indian women journalists
20th-century Indian women writers
20th-century Indian journalists
Journalists from Uttar Pradesh
People from Etah district
Women writers from Uttar Pradesh